John Albers is a Georgia State Senator serving the 56th District, which encompasses portions of Fulton, Cobb and Cherokee Counties.

Early life and education
Senator Albers earned his bachelor of science degree in organizational leadership from the University of Louisville. Albers also graduated from the University of Georgia's Legislative Leadership Institute and the Cybersecurity program at Harvard University.

Senator Albers has long been an active member of his community.  His affiliations include numerous boards of directors for business, civic and charitable organizations.

Family
Senator John Albers and his wife, Kari of 30 years live in Roswell, GA. They have two sons and are members of Roswell United Methodist Church.

Political career
Albers was first elected to serve as senator for Georgia's 56th District in the 2010 general election. Albers has won re-election every two years from 2012 through 2022. Senator Albers is a member of the Republican Party.

In the legislature, Senator Albers serves as chairman of the Senate Public Safety Committee, sub committee chairman of Appropriations, and vice chairman of the Senate Finance Committee. He also sits on the Senate Government Oversight, and Regulated Industries, and Rules Committees.

See also
 List of state government committees (Georgia)

References

External links
 Official site. senatoralbers.com. Retrieved June 28, 2013.
 Facebook. facebook.com. Retrieved June 28, 2013.
 Georgia State Senate page. senate.ga.gov. Retrieved June 28, 2013.

Republican Party Georgia (U.S. state) state senators
Living people
People from Roswell, Georgia
University of Georgia alumni
University of Louisville alumni
1972 births
21st-century American politicians